Tennyson are a Canadian musical duo consisting of siblings Luke and Tess Pretty formed in 2012.

Origins 
Tennyson was formed by Luke and Tess Pretty in 2012. The pair began busking in Edmonton between ages 7 and 9, covering songs by bands such as The Beatles, Coldplay, and Weezer.

Both Tess and Luke were encouraged to be creative from a very young age by their father, Greg Pretty. Luke and Tess shared how their father did this by painting shapes and images on their tables and chairs at home, as well as helping them make intricate homemade Halloween costumes throughout their childhood.

Once Luke started gaining a following for his electronic style music, the duo decided to fuse their Jazz and Blues background with Luke's electronic and sound sample styled music.

Musical career

2012-2016 
In 2014, Luke decided to incorporate electronica into his music, enlisting his sister on drums, and posting the resulting music to SoundCloud. This gained the attention of Canadian producer Ryan Hemsworth, who chose the track "You're Cute" to launch his online imprint "Secret Songs".

Later that year, Tennyson released two tracks: “With You” and “Lay-by.”

In 2015, Tennyson released the Like What? EP with six tracks. The music video for the title track was directed by Fantavious Fritz.

Tennyson performed an opening act for M83's Junk tour in 2016, they were also featured in the Lollapalooza lineup in 2016.

2017-2021 
Tennyson performed at numerous music festivals in 2017. They performed alongside artists such as Vince Staples, BADBADNOTGOOD, Dawes, Post Malone, Moby, Wiz Khalifa, Flying Lotus, The Knocks, Chris Lake, Gorillaz, Lorde, blink-182 and Chance the Rapper.

In 2017, Tennyson collaborated with BJ the Chicago Kid and Mr. Carmack to create the EP entitled Tuesday, Wednesday, Thursday. The collaborators partnered with Red Bull to release the EP for the Red Bull Sound Select event. Tennyson was also featured on Red Bull’s website.

Later that year, the duo had toured in Europe, Asia and Australia.

On March 1, 2019, Tennyson released Different Water quickly followed by the release of the EP entitled Telescope on November 22, 2019. Different Water has been described as "memorable melodies and busy, layered beats with touches of their jazz background sliding in and out of their compositions".

Different Water and Telescope included more vocal tracks than usual for the duo. Telescope was inspired by Luke's time in Japan and Waneella's viral image. Luke wanted to capture the image's feelings of clarity and stillness through sound in his album.

2022-present 
Luke Pretty released his debut album entitled Rot on February 18, 2022. The music of Rot was inspired by the musician's struggle with a hearing condition he developed due to mold exposure. Tennyson were listed on Billboard's 10 Dance Artists To Watch in 2022.

In the same year, Tennyson went on various show tours across the North America and Europe. The duo was joined by the guitarist Beau Diako and bassist Akos Forgacs.

Musical style 
The pair's "indietronic pop" style of music has been described as "a little R&B, a little jazz, a little classical, divinely characterised through the diverse array of instruments present". Many of their tracks contain organic sounds such as water, fire, and percussive sounds from bongo drums, glass and jungle-inspired beats. They have also been known to sample a wide range of sounds, such as purring cats, ring tones, texting noises, Mac OS sound effects and notably the "door left ajar" car sound in their track "Lay-by".

Following the release of Different Water EP, Luke released a sample pack bearing the same name on Splice.

Discography

Studio albums

Extended plays

Singles

Collaborations

Remixes

References

External links 

Official website

Canadian electronic music groups
Owsla artists
Living people
Musical groups from Edmonton
Year of birth missing (living people)